The Hula painted frog (Latonia nigriventer) is an amphibian and the only living member of the genus Latonia. The Hula painted frog was thought to be extinct as a result of habitat destruction during the 1950s until the species was rediscovered in 2011. It is endemic to the Lake Hula marshes in Israel.

The draining of Lake Hula and its marshes in the 1950s was thought to have caused the extinction of this frog, along with the cyprinid fish Acanthobrama hulensis and cichlid fish Tristramella intermedia. Only five individuals had been found prior to the draining of the lake. Environmental improvements in the Hula reserve have been cited as a possible reason for the frog's reemergence.

Description
The Hula painted frog has a dark belly with small white spots. It is colored ochre above with a rusty colour grading into dark olive-grey to greyish-black on the sides. Differences from the common painted frog (Discoglossus pictus) include its greater interocular distance, longer forelimbs, and a less projecting snout. The type specimen was an adult female with a body length of 

Little is known about its history, because few specimens have been found by scientists. Two adults and two tadpoles were collected in 1940 and a single specimen was found in 1955. This would prove to be the last record of this species until 2011.

The four 1940 specimens were to be used as types, but the smaller, half-grown frog was eaten by the larger one in captivity.

According to an ecologist of the Israel Nature and Parks Authority, the frog's Hebrew name, agulashon shehor-gahon (Black-bellied round-tongued), derives from its black belly and round tongue. The scientific name of the species reflects these details as well. Unlike the tongues of other frogs, it is not used to catch prey.

This frog was originally proposed to be a member of the genus Discoglossus, but further genetic and morphological assessment after the rediscovery of the species led a reassignment to Genus Latonia, for which no other living examples are known. However, based on phylogenetic analysis, it was estimated that the its closest related genus, Discoglossus. On this basis, the Hula painted frog has been labeled a living fossil, the only extant representative of an ancient genetic split.

Conservation status
In 1996, the IUCN classified this species as "extinct in the wild", the very first amphibian to be given that designation by the IUCN. Israel continued to list it as an endangered species in the slim hope that a relict population may be found in the Golan Heights or in southern Lebanon. Following the rediscovery of the species in 2011, the IUCN now considers the frog to be critically endangered as its known habitat occupies less than 2 km2.

In 2000, a scientist from the Lebanese nature protection organisation A Rocha claimed he had seen a frog species which could be Latonia nigriventer in the Aammiq Wetland south of the Beqaa Valley in Lebanon. Two French-Lebanese-British expeditions in the years 2004 and 2005 yielded no confirmation as to the further existence of this species. In August 2010, a search organised by the Amphibian Specialist Group of the International Union for Conservation of Nature set out to look for various species of frogs thought to be extinct in the wild, including the Hula painted frog.

Current Research 
In 2013, a study published in Nature Communications revealed that in 2011 during a routine patrol at the Hula Nature Reserve, ranger Yoram Malka found the frog, which he immediately suspected as being the Hula painted frog, as he claimed he has been on the lookout for it for many years. Scientists confirmed that it was one of this rare species. An ecologist with the Israel Nature and Parks Authority credited the rehydration of the area for the frog sighting. On November 29, a second specimen was located in the same area. The second Hula painted frog, a female, was found in swampy weeds twenty centimeters deep. It weighed 13 grams, half the weight of its male counterpart. Since the discovery of the first specimen, at least ten more individuals have been found, all in the same area.

In 2016, a team led by Professor Sarig Gafni of the Ruppin Academic Center's School of Marine Sciences discovered populations totaling several hundred individuals by searching in water at night, instead of in marsh mud, finding populations in 17 of the 52 Hula Valley water holes they surveyed.

In 2017, an article published in the Molecular Ecology Journal, mentions of a group of scientists who investigated the suitable aquatic habitats for Hula painted frogs using the environmental DNA (eDNA) approach. The Hula Lake once provided a habitat for many rare species including this frog. Since, the 2011 rediscovery of this species in this region (in the Hula nature reserve), consequent efforts to study and protect it started. However, these efforts have been hampered by the elusive nature of this species (that also prevented it being found from the 1950s-2010s). Since, there is a lack of systematic and efficient methodology to detect a rare amphibian or aquatic species, including this Hula painted frogs, they were designated “extinct”; until their rediscovery at a later stage.

Environmental DNA (eDNA) is becoming a ‘go-to’ tool for detecting species presence in aquatic environments. eDNA extraction (genetic material extracted through water filtrate) followed by quantitative Polymerase Chain Reaction (qPCR is a technique to amplify genetic material in real time) are highly sensitive methods which can increase the detection probability of rare organisms. To be more reliable the researchers concluded a site to be positive for the presence of Hula painted frogs if the water contains eDNA and if the physical presence of frog is detected as well. Thus, these researchers sampled 52 sites and found that 22 sites were positive for the presence of Hula painted frogs. Most of the positive sites were located in the regions around Hula Nature Reserve, Agamon ha-Hula, and Ein Te’o Nature Reserve. These regions overlap with the former Hula Lake region, and also contain organic, and colluvial-alluvial soils.

Such findings in the regions around reserved parks indicate the importance of nature parks in conservation of wild-life. The suitable habitats predicted by employing the eDNA are of great importance for identifying potential sites for future translocation to save this rare frog.

In 2018, another article published in Nature Scientific Reports, mentioned that this species has low abundance and dispersal capability, calling for urgent conservation measures. The total estimate of potentially reproducing adults in this population (Nad) is found to be 234-235 individuals. They determined the population genetics of this species through a capture-recapture study on 118 adult frogs, and through micro-satellite analysis. It could be due to the presence of one more unknown population or genetic admixture leading to a high genetic diversity and low inbreeding in spite of a less population. 

Future research calls for understanding the habitat locations of another population which is not well studied, or different spots within the Hula valley location in which the frog species can be present. The aquatic habitats of this species are prone to disturbance and anthropogenic hazards which could imperil the survival of endangered Hula frogs. Thus outcomes of any future research dealing with prediction of the favorable dwelling habitats of this rare species, and their habitat characterization will be vital to protect the only living member of genus Latonia, by recommending characteristics of safer spots.

See also

Wildlife of Israel

References

External links

 ARKive: Images of specimen HUJZ Amphib. Discogl. 1 in life taken by Oz Rittner.
 "Watershed moment for extinct Israeli frog" – Israel21c
 Global Amphibian Assessment: Discoglossus nigriventer – Hula Painted Frog. Contains map of locations where specimens were found.

Additional data and discoveries were published in Haaretz newspaper on 15/04/2016
 http://www.haaretz.co.il/news/science/.premium-1.2915938
Among the discoveries are Tadpole data, which is very small, up to 2.5 cm, and becomes even smaller as adult, the largest adult caught was 13 cm long which suggest it was several decades old.
Also sound was first noticed and it is a very weak one.

Amphibians of the Middle East
Fauna of Lebanon
Painted frogs
Taxa named by Heinz Steinitz
Amphibians described in 1943
Endemic fauna of Israel
Hula Valley